Zolitūde Station is a railway station on the Torņakalns–Tukums II Railway.

References

External links

Railway stations in Riga
Railway stations opened in 1989